The First Three Years is a compilation album by singer-songwriter Frank Turner, released 1 December 2008 through Xtra Mile Recordings. The compilation is also included on the re-release of Love Ire & Song, released 26 January 2009. The album itself is only available directly from Xtra Mile.

The album compiles material that does not appear on either of Turner's three studio albums, including tracks from early EPs, split singles, covers and unreleased material. The collection also includes a cover of "Smiling at Strangers on Trains" – Turner's former band, Million Dead's, first single.

The title and cover artwork reference the Black Flag album The First Four Years, a similar compilation of early material.

Track listing

Frank Turner albums
2008 compilation albums